Dance Dance Revolution is a music video game series by Konami. It may also refer to the following articles.

Video games 

Dance Dance Revolution (1998 video game), a 1998 music arcade game and ported to PlayStation in 1999
Dancing Stage (video game) also known as Dance Dance Revolution, a 2001 video game for PlayStation
Dance Dance Revolution (2010 video game), a 2010 game for Wii, PlayStation 3, and Xbox 360
Dance Dance Revolution (2013 video game), a 2013 music arcade game

Others
"Dance Dance Revolution" (song), song by DDR All Stars from the music video game Dance Dance Revolution Extreme
Dance Dance Revolution (book), an anthology of poems by Cathy Park Hong

See also
Dance Revolution, a 2006 television series based on the video game series